Klasa A represents the seventh level of the Polish football hierarchy. Teams promoted from Klasa A move up to the liga okręgowa, whilst relegated teams descend to the Klasa B leagues.

The exceptions are Klasa A in the Podlaskie Voivodeship, where it is the lowest tier of the game (no Klasa B), and in the Greater Poland Voivodeship, where it is the eighth tier of the football hierarchy, due to the existence of V liga in this region.

History
In 1920–1927, Klasa A was the highest level of regional competitions, class A champions met in the finals of the non-league Polish Championships. In 1928, the league joined the Polish Football Association and Klasa A became the second tier of the competition – its champions were promoted as a result of multi-stage play-offs. In the 1930s, district leagues were gradually established, thus class A became the third level of the competition. It regained its importance shortly after the Second World War in 1946–1947, when the non-league Polish Championships were played again. In the following years, the successively created or liquidated leagues (second, third, fourth, fifth) resulted in the fact that Klasa A fell in the hierarchy of games in Poland.

Groups
Lower Silesian Voivodeship
 grupa jeleniogórska I
 grupa jeleniogórska II
 grupa jeleniogórska III
 grupa legnicka I
 grupa legnicka II
 grupa legnicka III
 grupa wałbrzyska I
 grupa wałbrzyska II
 grupa wałbrzyska III
 grupa wałbrzyska IV
 grupa wrocławska I
 grupa wrocławska II
 grupa wrocławska III
 grupa wrocławska IV
Kuyavian-Pomeranian Voivodeship
 grupa bydgoska I
 grupa bydgoska II
 grupa toruńska
 grupa włocławska
Lublin Voivodeship
 grupa bialskopodlaska
 grupa chełmska
 grupa lubelska I
 grupa lubelska II
 grupa lubelska III
 grupa lubelska IV
 grupa zamojska I
 grupa zamojska II
Lubusz Voivodeship
 grupa gorzowska I
 grupa gorzowska II
 grupa gorzowska III
 grupa zielonogórska I
 grupa zielonogórska II
 grupa zielonogórska III
 grupa zielonogórska IV
Łódź Voivodeship
 grupa łódzka I
 grupa łódzka II
 grupa łódzka III
 grupa piotrkowska I
 grupa piotrkowska II
 grupa sieradzka I
 grupa sieradzka II
 grupa skierniewicka
Lesser Poland Voivodeship
 grupa chrzanowska
 grupa krakowska I
 grupa krakowska II
 grupa krakowska III
 grupa limanowska
 grupa myślenicka
 grupa nowosądecka
 grupa nowosądecko-gorlicka
 grupa olkuska
 grupa oświęcimska
 grupa podhalańska
 grupa tarnowska I
 grupa tarnowska II
 grupa tarnowska III
 grupa tarnowska IV
 grupa wadowicka
 grupa wielicka
Masovian Voivodeship
 grupa ciechanowsko-ostrołęcka
 grupa płocka
 grupa radomska I
 grupa radomska II
 grupa siedlecka 
 grupa warszawska I
 grupa warszawska II
 grupa warszawska III
 grupa warszawska IV
Opole Voivodeship
 grupa opolska I
 grupa opolska II
 grupa opolska III
 grupa opolska IV
 grupa opolska V
 grupa opolska VI
Subcarpathian Voivodeship
 grupa dębicka I
 grupa dębicka II
 grupa jarosławska
 grupa krośnieńska I
 grupa krośnieńska II
 grupa lubaczowska
 grupa przemyska
 grupa przeworska
 grupa rzeszowska I
 grupa rzeszowska II
 grupa rzeszowska III
 grupa stalowowolska I
 grupa stalowowolska II
Podlaskie Voivodeship
 grupa podlaska I
 grupa podlaska II
Pomeranian Voivodeship
 grupa gdańska I
 grupa gdańska II
 grupa gdańska III
 grupa malborska IV
 grupa słupska I
 grupa słupska II
Silesian Voivodeship
 grupa bielska
 grupa bytomska
 grupa częstochowska I
 grupa częstochowska II
 grupa katowicka
 grupa lubliniecka
 grupa raciborska
 grupa rybnicka
 grupa skoczowska
 grupa sosnowiecka
 grupa tyska
 grupa zabrzańska
 grupa żywiecka
Holy Cross Voivodeship
 grupa świętokrzyska I
 grupa świętokrzyska II
Warmian-Masurian Voivodeship
 grupa warmińsko-mazurska I
 grupa warmińsko-mazurska II
 grupa warmińsko-mazurska III
 grupa warmińsko-mazurska IV
Greater Poland Voivodeship
 grupa kaliska I
 grupa kaliska II
 grupa konińska I
 grupa konińska II
 grupa leszczyńska I
 grupa leszczyńska II
 grupa pilska I
 grupa pilska II
 grupa poznańska I
 grupa poznańska II
 grupa poznańska III
West Pomeranian Voivodeship
 grupa koszalińska I
 grupa koszalińska II
 grupa koszalińska III
 grupa koszalińska IV
 grupa szczecińska I
 grupa szczecińska II
 grupa szczecińska III
 grupa szczecińska IV
 grupa szczecińska V
 grupa szczecińska VI

References

External links
 Ligi regionalne 2020–21 

7